Drug-induced lipodystrophy is a cutaneous condition that presents as one or multiple depressed areas (i.e. indentations), usually on the proximal extremities, ranging from under a few centimeters to greater than 20 cm in diameter.

See also 
 HIV-associated lipodystrophy
 Lipoatrophia semicircularis
 List of cutaneous conditions

References 

Conditions of the subcutaneous fat
Drug-induced diseases